In mathematics, Bochner's formula is a statement relating harmonic functions on a Riemannian manifold  to the Ricci curvature.  The formula is named after the American mathematician Salomon Bochner.

Formal statement
If  is a smooth function, then
,
If  is harmonic  (i.e., where  is the Laplacian with respect to the metric ), Bochner's formula becomes
.
Bochner used this formula to prove the Bochner vanishing theorem.

.
This immediately follows from the first identity, observing that the integral of the left-hand side vanishes (by the divergence theorem) and integrating by parts the first term on the right-hand side.

Variations and generalizations
Bochner identity
Weitzenböck identity

References

Differential geometry